Bramhall Hill is a hill in the west and southwest of the downtown peninsula of Portland, Maine. At its height, the hill stands  feet above sea level, with a sharp drop below. The area includes the West End neighborhood, the Western Promenade and part of the Old Port downtown district.

Bramhall Hill commands an extensive view west and north-west of the bay, the mainland and the White Mountains some 80 miles away. The finest residence district is on Bramhall Hill. The area was originally the property of George Bramhall.

Bramhall was killed during the French and Indian Wars in the late 17th century. He was a tanner by profession and set up a tannery in the area.

In 1870, a 20-inch main brought water from Sebago Lake to a  reservoir on Bramhall Hill. This supplied most of the city's drinking water.

The first capital conviction in the United States Courts after the adoption of the Constitution occurred on Bramhall Hill in 1790. Thomas Bird was convicted of  piracy and murder. After a prompt refusal for pardon by President George Washington, Bird was executed.

References

External links
 The glacial gravels of Maine and their associated deposits By George Hapgood Stone Page 232, 1899
 Plan of land on Bramhall Hill by Peleg Wadsworth MaineMemory.net
 Reservoir on Bramhall's Hill, Portland MaineMemory.net

Geography of Portland, Maine
West End (Portland, Maine)